Denah Weinberg was an Orthodox Jewish Rebbetzin and founder and dean of EYAHT College of Jewish Studies for Women in Jerusalem. EYAHT has over 2,000 alumnae. She was also a speaker on women's issues in Israel and abroad, and published several essays in Jewish women's anthologies. She was married to Rabbi Noah Weinberg, founder of Yeshivat Aish HaTorah. She died in Jerusalem on March 12, 2023.

Biography
Denah Weinberg was born in Far Rockaway, Queens, New York to Albert and Esther Goldman. Albert was the youngest of eight children of Rabbi Yaakov Yitzchok Goldman, rabbi of Congregation Ohave Shalom in Pawtucket, Rhode Island, and his wife, Dina. Weinberg had two sisters, Naomi and Judy, both of whom are deceased.

She married Noah Weinberg in New York in February 1958. They lived in Jerusalem, Israel and raised 8 sons and 4 daughters. One of their sons, Rabbi Hillel Weinberg, briefly succeeded his father as rosh yeshiva of Aish HaTorah. She was widowed in 2009.

Founding EYAHT
After giving weekly classes to women in her Kiryat Sanz apartment for several years, in 1984, with seed money from Aish HaTorah, she opened the EYAHT college in two ground-floor apartments located across the street from her home. She named the college "EYAHT" by creating an acronym for the phrase, אשה יראת ה' היא תתהלל, Eesha Yirat Adonoy Hee Tithallal, "A woman who fears God, she shall be praised" (Proverbs 31:30).

Rebbitzen Weinberg taught The 48 Ways to Wisdom, a curriculum developed by her husband based on Pirkei Avot. She also taught a curriculum on the beauty and meaning of Shabbat, which she developed. She placed a strong emphasis on the role of the Jewish woman in her family and community, with special classes in shalom bayit (marital harmony) and chinuch habanim (raising Jewish children).

Shortly after inaugurating a five-story,  campus for EYAHT in the Romema neighborhood in 2014, EYAHT was closed.

Death
On March 12, 2023, after many years of dealing with respiratory issues, Rebbetzin Denah Weinberg died. Aish HaTorah wrote on its instagram,

"It is with much sorrow and pain that we have

just learned of the passing of Rebetzin Denah Weinberg A"

H. All of our hearts are broken at the loss of this

groundbreaking women's educator and the wife of Rav

Noach Weinberg zt"I. May the Almighty comfort her family

during this difficult time." - Aish CEO Rabbi Steven Burg

The impact Rebetzin Weinberg has created since the

founding of Aish almost 50 years ago until today is

immeasurable. The entire Aish family joins in mourning

with the Weinberg family on the passing of this truly amazing human being."

Speaker, writer, and community activist
Rebbetzin Weinberg was a featured speaker at the annual Aish HaTorah Partners Conference in New York. She published several essays in books geared to Jewish women.

During the 2006 Lebanon War, she launched a "1000 Soldiers, 1000 Women Praying" campaign to sign up 1000 women to pray once a day for the welfare of Israeli soldiers on the battle lines.

Published works
"What is Your Potential?" by Denah Weinberg — published in Jewish Matters: A Pocketbook of Knowledge and Inspiration. Doron Kornbluth, ed (1999). Targum/Feldheim. .
 "Shabbat Candles: Lights of the Soul" by Rebbetzin Denah Weinberg — published in Kornbluth, Sarah Tikvah (2000). Jewish Women Speak About Jewish Matters.

References

Rebbetzins
American Orthodox Jews
Israeli Orthodox Jews
Living people
Year of birth missing (living people)